The FAMAS Award for Best Supporting Actor is one of the FAMAS Awards given to people working in the motion picture industry by the Filipino Academy of Movie Arts and Sciences Award, which are voted on by Palanca Award-winning writers and movie columnists and writers within the industry. It was first awarded in the first FAMAS Ceremony in 1953.

Winners and nominees
The list may be incomplete. In particular, it may not include some of the names of the nominees and the roles portrayed especially during the early years of FAMAS Awards.

In the lists below, the winner of the award for each year is shown first, followed by the other nominees.

1950s

1960s

1970s

1980s

1990s

2000s

2010s

References

External links
The Unofficial Website of the Filipino Academy of Movie Arts and Sciences
FAMAS Awards

Best Supporting Actor